Omar Saifeddine Zeineddine (born 13 June 1987) is a Lebanese former professional footballer who played as a midfielder.

Career
In 2017, Zeineddine moved to Indonesian club Perseru Serui.

References

External links

 
 
 

1987 births
Living people
People from North Governorate
Lebanese footballers
Association football midfielders
Riada Wal Adab Club players
Lebanese Premier League players
Salam Zgharta FC players
Lebanese expatriate footballers
Expatriate footballers in Indonesia
Lebanese expatriate sportspeople in Indonesia
Liga 1 (Indonesia) players
Perseru Serui players
Nejmeh SC players